Weekly Dispatch may refer to:

 New York Weekly Dispatch, a New York City paper published 1855–1858, succeeded by the New York Weekly, 1858–1910, and New York Weekly Welcome, 1910–1915
 Weekly Dispatch (1801), London, renamed to Sunday Dispatch in 1928
 Richmond Weekly Dispatch, Richmond, Virginia
 South Australian Weekly Dispatch, South Australia